is a railway station in the town of Nogi, Tochigi, Japan, operated by the East Japan Railway Company (JR East).

Lines
Nogi Station is served by the Tōhoku Main Line (Utsunomiya Line), and is located 69.4 kilometers from the starting point of the line at

Station layout
The station consists of a single island platform, with an elevated station building. The station is staffed.

Platforms

History
Nogi Station opened on 16 February 1963. On 1 April 1987 the station came under the control of JR East with the privatization of Japanese National Railways (JNR).

Passenger statistics
In fiscal 2019, the station was used by an average of 4619 passengers daily (boarding passengers only).

Surrounding area
 Nogi Town Hall
 Nogi Post Office

See also
 List of railway stations in Japan

References

External links

 JR East Station information 

Railway stations in Tochigi Prefecture
Utsunomiya Line
Stations of East Japan Railway Company
Railway stations in Japan opened in 1963
Nogi, Tochigi